Etna High School (EHS) (also known as Etna Union High School) is a small public high school in Etna, California, United States.

History 
Etna High School was founded in 1891 in Etna, a community founded as a result of the California Gold Rush.

As of the 2015-2016 school year, there are 24 members of the faculty and staff.

Academics 
Spanish is offered as a second language.

Athletics 
Etna High School's colors are red, white, and black, and the team names are the Lions. Pam Rimmer is the Athletic Director. The seasonal sports offered are as follows:

Extracurriculars

EHS Radio News 
On 3 December 2015, Etna High broadcast its first radio program, featuring interviews and  news reporting by students.

References 

Public high schools in California
Schools in Siskiyou County, California
1891 establishments in California